Paths of Faith (Spanish:Senderos de fe) is a 1938 Argentine drama film directed by Luis Moglia Barth and starring Amanda Ledesma, Floren Delbene and Pedro Maratea.

Cast
 Amanda Ledesma 
 Floren Delbene
 Pedro Maratea 
 Marcos Caplán 
 Juan Carlos Thorry
 Silvia Durante 
 Juan Bono 
 Ernesto Villegas 
 Lalo Malcolm
 Elvino Vardaro

References

Bibliography 
 Rist, Peter H. Historical Dictionary of South American Cinema. Rowman & Littlefield, 2014.

External links 

1938 films
Argentine drama films
1938 drama films
1930s Spanish-language films
Films directed by Luis Moglia Barth
Argentine black-and-white films
1930s Argentine films